Martina Hingis and Nathalie Tauziat were the defending champions, but chose not to participate that year.

Kimberly Po-Messerli and Nicole Pratt won in the final 6–3, 6–1, against Tina Križan and Katarina Srebotnik.

Seeds
The top four seeds received a bye into the second round.

Draw

Finals

Top half

Bottom half

External links
Draw and Qualifying Draw

Rogers ATandT Cup
2001 Canada Masters and the Rogers AT&T Cup